Westmoreland Street is a street on the Southside of Dublin. It is currently a one-way street. It carries a segment of the R138 road for northbound traffic; nearby D'Olier Street carries southbound traffic of that segment.

Location
It is one of the two broad avenues, along with D'Olier Street, that converge at their northern ends at O'Connell Bridge over the River Liffey. Westmoreland Street links the bridge to Trinity College at College Green at its southern end, from where traffic diverges between Grafton Street to the south and Dame Street to the west. Westmoreland Street also constitutes the eastern border of Temple Bar.

History
The street is named after John Fane, 10th Earl of Westmorland, who was Lord Lieutenant of Ireland from 1789 to 1794. It was one of the last streets laid out by the Wide Streets Commission, with the original plans set out in 1792 by Henry Aaron Baker and accepted in 1799.

Architecture

One of the dominant buildings on the street is the former Educational Chambers on the corner of Fleet Street. The original building and facade were significantly altered with a design by architect Sam Stephenson in the early 1970s for EBS. The terracotta facade was demolished and replaced with dark mirror glass which was dubbed a "diabolical black box" by a city councillor at the time it was constructed. The EBS had also acquired three adjoining buildings, the Paradiso restaurant, the main office of The Irish Times, and Graham's pharmacy with plans to demolish these and replicate the dark glass treatment. However, the planers insisted on solid granite elements for this side of the facade, which rendered the whole scheme lop-sided. The facade of the former Paradiso, an art nouveau design, was retained within the centre of the redevelopment and houses the building's atrium.

Luas

Westmoreland Luas stop is on the Green Line (northbound only). This line connects with the Red line and runs from Broombridge in North Dublin and Bride's Glen. Construction started in June 2013 with services beginning in December 2017.

See also
Pat Ingoldsby, Irish poet and TV presenter who frequently sold his books on the street.

References

Streets in Dublin (city)